Lasbela or Las bela (Urdu: لسبيله) may refer to:

 Las Bela (princely state) in Balochistan, British India
 Lasbela District in Balochistan, Pakistan
 Lasbela (Karachi), a neighbourhood in Karachi, Pakistan
 Lasbela Bridge in Karachi